Mario Andrew Pei (February 16, 1901March 2, 1978) was an Italian-born American linguist and polyglot who wrote a number of popular books known for their accessibility to readers without a professional background in linguistics. His book The Story of Language (1949) was acclaimed for its presentation of technical linguistics concepts in ways that were entertaining and accessible to a general audience. 

Pei was a supporter of uniting humans under one language, and in 1958 published a book entitled One Language For the World and How to Achieve It and sent a copy to the leader of every nation in existence at the time. The book argued that the United Nations should select one language—regardless of whether it was an existing natural language like English or a constructed language like Esperanto—and require it to be taught as a second language to every schoolchild in the world.

Life and career
Pei was born in Rome, Italy, and emigrated to the United States with his mother in order to join his father in April 1908. By the time that he was out of high school, he spoke not only English and his native Italian but also French and had studied Latin as well. Over the years, he became fluent in several other languages (including Spanish, Portuguese, Russian, and German) capable of speaking some thirty others, having become acquainted with the structure of at least one hundred of the world's languages.

In 1923, he began his career teaching languages at City College of New York, and in 1928 he published his translation of Vittorio Ermete de Fiori's Mussolini: The Man of Destiny. Pei received a PhD from Columbia University in 1937, focusing on Sanskrit, Old Church Slavonic, and Old French.

That year, he joined the Department of Romance Languages at Columbia University, becoming a full professor in 1952. In 1941, he published his first language book, The Italian Language. His facility with languages was in demand in World War II, and Pei served as a language consultant with two agencies of the Department of War. In this role, he wrote language textbooks, developed language courses, and wrote language guidebooks.

While working as a professor of Romance Philology at Columbia University, Pei wrote over 50 books, including the best-sellers The Story of Language (1949) and The Story of English (1952). His other books included Languages for War and Peace (1943; later retitled The World's Chief Languages), A Dictionary of Linguistics (written with Frank Gaynor, 1954), All About Language (1954), Invitation to Linguistics: A Basic Introduction to the Science of Language (1965), and Weasel Words: Saying What You Don't Mean (1978).

Pei wrote The America We Lost: The Concerns of a Conservative (1968), a book advocating individualism and constitutional literalism. In the book, Pei denounces the income tax as well as communism and other forms of collectivism.

Pei was also an internationalist and advocated the introduction of Esperanto into school curricula across the world to supplement local languages.

He died on March 2, 1978.  Arrangements were made with George Van Tassel's Community Funeral Home in Bloomfield, N.J., and burial at St. Raymond's Cemetery in the Bronx followed.

Pei and Esperanto
Pei was fond of Esperanto, an international auxiliary language. He wrote his positive views on it in his book called One Language for the World. He also wrote a 21-page pamphlet entirely on world language and Esperanto called Wanted: a World Language.

Quotes

Value of neologisms
Noting that neologisms are of immense value to the continued existence of a living language, as most words are developed as neologisms from root words, Pei stated in The Story of Language:

Creative innovation and slang

Works

Language
Languages for War and Peace (later retitled The World's Chief Languages), 1949, Vanni/George Allen & Unwin
One Language for the World, 1958, Biblio-Moser, 
Wanted: a World Language, New York: 1969, Public Affairs CommitteeFrench Precursors of the Chanson de Roland, 1949, AMS PressStory of Language, 1949, Lippincott, All About Language, 1950, LippincottLiberal arts dictionary in English, French, German [and] Spanish, 1952, Philosophical LibraryLiberal Arts Dictionary (with Frank Gaynor), 1952, Philosophical LibraryA Dictionary Of Linguistics (with Frank Gaynor), 1954, Philosophical LibraryLanguage For Everybody;: What It Is And How To Master It, 1956, New American LibraryGetting Along in Italian, 1958, BantamGetting Along in Russian, 1959, HarperGetting Along in French (with John Fisher), 1961, Bantam109 Most Useful Foreign Phrases for the Traveler, 1962, CurtisVoices of Man: The Meaning and Function of Language, 1962, Harper & RowThe Story of English: A Modern Approach, 1962, PremierInvitation to Linguistics: A Basic Introduction to the Science of Language, 1965, Doubleday, Glossary of Linguistic Terminology, 1966, Columbia University Press, Studies In Romance Philology And Literature, 1966, Garnett PublishingWords in Sheep's Clothing, 1969Talking Your Way Around the World, 1971, Harper-Collins, Getting along in Spanish, 1972, BantamWeasel Words, 1972, Harper & RowHow To Learn Languages And What Languages To Learn, 1973, Harper & Row, Families of Words, 1974, St Martins Press,  0312280351Dictionary Of Foreign Terms, 1975, Delacorte Press, What's In A Word? Language: yesterday, today, and tomorrow, 1975, UniversalThe Story of Latin and the Romance Languages, 1976, Harper-Collins, New Italian Self-Taught, 1982, Harpercollins, 

DiscographyMedieval Romance Poetry, 1961 (Folkways Records)One Language for the World, 1961 (Folkways)Getting Along in Russian, Vol. 1, 1962 (Folkways)Getting Along in Russian, Vol. 2, 1962 (Folkways)Getting Along in French, Vol. 1, 1962 (Folkways)Readings in Church Latin – Caesar and Cicero: Read by Dr. Mario A. Pei, 1962 (Folkways)Readings in Church Latin – Virgil and Horace: Read by Dr. Mario A. Pei, 1962 (Folkways)Getting Along in English, Vol. 1, 1964 (Folkways)

OtherThe American road to peace: a constitution for the world, 1945, S.F. Vanni 
Introduction to Ada Boni, Talisman Italian Cookbook. 1950. Crown PublishersSwords of Anjou, 1953, John Day Company.  Pei's first and only novel, praised in HISPANICA [1953] as "an admirable combination of absorbing narrative and sound scholarship ..." THE CONSUMER'S MANIFESTO: A Bill Of Rights to Protect the Consumer in the Wars Between Capital and Labor, 1960, Crown PublishersOur National Heritage, 1965, Houghton MifflinAmerica We Lost: The Concerns of a Conservative, 1968, World PublishingTales of the natural and supernatural,'', 1971, Devin-Adair

See also
Remarks on the Esperanto Symposium
Mario Pei On Esperanto Education
One Language For The World
Pei Discography at Smithsonian Folkways

Notes

1901 births
1978 deaths
Linguists from the United States
Linguists from Italy
Italian emigrants to the United States
American Esperantists
Xavier High School (New York City) alumni
20th-century linguists